One hundred and forty-four Guggenheim Fellowships were awarded in 1949.

1949 U.S. and Canadian Fellows

1949 Latin American and Caribbean Fellows

See also
 Guggenheim Fellowship
 List of Guggenheim Fellowships awarded in 1948
 List of Guggenheim Fellowships awarded in 1950

References

1949
1949 awards